Marko Mugoša (born June 12, 1993) is a Montenegrin professional basketball player for Lovćen 1947 of the ABA League Second Division and the Prva A Liga.

External links
 Player Profile at eurobasket.com

1993 births
Living people
ABA League players
KK Budućnost players
KK Lovćen players
KK Mornar Bar players
KK Podgorica players
KK Sutjeska players
Montenegrin men's basketball players
Shooting guards
Sportspeople from Podgorica